Hamirowal is a village in Shaheed Bhagat Singh Nagar district of Punjab State, India. The village is administrated by Sarpanch an elected representative of the village.

Demography 
As of 2011, Hamirowal has a total number of 117 houses and population of 515 of which 257 include are males while 258 are females according to the report published by Census India in 2011. The literacy rate of Hamirowal is 73.03%, lower than the state average of 75.84%. The population of children under the age of 6 years is 59 which is 11.46% of total population of Hamirowal, and child sex ratio is approximately 1034 as compared to Punjab state average of 846.

Most of the people are from Schedule Caste which constitutes 83.50% of total population in Hamirowal. The town does not have any Schedule Tribe population so far.

As per the report published by Census India in 2011, 178 people were engaged in work activities out of the total population of Hamirowal which includes 157 males and 21 females. According to census survey report 2011, 98.31% workers describe their work as main work and 1.69% workers are involved in Marginal activity providing livelihood for less than 6 months.

Education 
Amardeep Singh Shergill Memorial college Mukandpur, Sikh National College Banga and Guru Nanak College of Nursing in Dhahan are the nearest colleges.

Transport 

See also 
List of villages in India

References

External links 
 Tourism of Punjab
 Census of Punjab
 Locality Based PINCode

Villages in Shaheed Bhagat Singh Nagar district